Nā-hki-lek or Na-hkilek is a river village on the Salween River in Shan State of eastern Burma. It lies on the confluence of the Salween and the Nam Pang River. A few miles north beyond the junction is said to be "a strange whirlpool, at the place the river is in a gorge between limestone cliffs, which fall smooth and precipitous to the water's edge."

It is located about 120 km east of Kengtung.

References

External links
Maplandia World Gazetteer
The Salween River

Communities on the Salween River
Populated places in Shan State
Villages in Myanmar